The 1948 Nobel Prize in Literature was awarded to British-American poet Thomas Stearns Eliot (pen name, T. S. Eliot) (1888–1965) "for his outstanding, pioneer contribution to present-day poetry." Eliot is the fourth British (born in the United States) recipient of the prize after John Galsworthy in 1932.

Laureate

T.S. Eliot was a highly influential poet known for works such as The Waste Land (1922) and Four Quartets (1940). His belief that poetry should aim to represent the complexities of modern civilization made him one of the most daring innovators of 20th century poetry. He also wrote essays and plays such as Murder in the Cathedral (1935).

Deliberations

Nominations
T.S. Eliot was nominated for the Nobel Prize in Literature on seven occasions, the first time in 1945. In 1948, three nominations for Eliot were submitted which eventually led to him being awarded the prize. 

In total, the Nobel committee received 45 nominations for 32 individuals including André Malraux, Georges Duhamel, Winston Churchill (awarded in 1953), Toyohiko Kagawa, Boris Pasternak (awarded in 1958), Nikolai Berdyaev, Mikhail Sholokov (awarded in 1965), Shmuel Yosef Agnon (awarded in 1966), Angelos Sikelianos, Mark Aldanov, and Arnulf Øverland. Seven of the nominees were nominated first-time among them George Santayana, Zalman Shneur, George Macauley Trevelyan, Halldór Laxness (awarded in 1955), and Riccardo Bacchelli. Three of the nominees were women: Marie Under, Sidonie-Gabrielle Colette and Dorothy Canfield Fisher.

The 1929 Nobel Prize laureate Thomas Mann was unconventionally nominated for a second prize by two members of the Swedish Academy. The authors Antonin Artaud, Charles A. Beard, Georges Bernanos, Alice Brown, Wilbur Lucius Cross, Osamu Dazai, André Fontainas, Susan Glaspell, Frederick Philip Grove, Victor Ido, Klara Johanson, Aldo Leopold, Monteiro Lobato, Emil Ludwig, Claude McKay, Thomas Mofolo, Na Hye-sok, Sextil Pușcariu, Antonin Sertillanges, Montague Summers, and Marcelle Tinayre died in 1948 without having been nominated for the prize. Russian philosopher Nikolai Berdyaev died months before the announcement.

Award ceremony speech
In his award ceremony speech on 10 December 1948, Anders Österling, permanent secretary of the Swedish Academy, said of Eliot: "His career is remarkable in that, from an extremely exclusive and consciously isolated position, he has gradually come to exercise a very far-reaching influence. At the outset he appeared to address himself to but a small circle of initiates, but this circle slowly widened, without his appearing to will it himself. Thus in Eliot’s verse and prose there was quite a special accent, which compelled attention just in our own time, a capacity to cut into the consciousness of our generation with the sharpness of a diamond."

Notes

References

External links
Award Ceremony speech nobelprize.org
List of all nominations for the 1948 Nobel Prize in Literature nobelprize.org

1948
Nobel Prize
T. S. Eliot